Castillon may refer to several communes in France:
Adèle Castillon, French Singer and actress
Castillon, Alpes-Maritimes, in the Alpes-Maritimes département 
Castillon, Calvados, in the  Calvados département 
Castillon (Canton of Arthez-de-Béarn), in the Pyrénées-Atlantiques département, in the canton of Arthez-de-Béarn
Castillon (Canton of Lembeye), in the Pyrénées-Atlantiques département in the canton de Lembeye 
Castillon, Hautes-Pyrénées, in the Hautes-Pyrénées département
Castillon-Debats, in the Gers département 
Castillon-de-Castets, in the Gironde département 
Castillon-de-Larboust, in the Haute-Garonne département 
Castillon-de-Saint-Martory, in the Haute-Garonne département 
Castillon-du-Gard, in the Gard département 
Castillon-en-Auge, in the Calvados département 
Castillon-en-Couserans, in the Ariège département 
Castillon-la-Bataille, in the Gironde département 
Castillon-Massas, in the Gers département 
Castillon-Savès, in the Gers département

Also
Lac de Castillon is a reservoir in Alpes-de-Haute-Provence, France